Thailand is in the middle of mainland Southeast Asia. The nation's axial position influenced many aspects of Thailand's society and culture. It controls the only land route from Asia to Malaysia and Singapore.

Physical geography
A fertile floodplain and tropical monsoon climate, ideally suited to wet-rice (tham na) cultivation, attracted settlers to this central area in preference to the marginal uplands and the highlands of the northern region or the Khorat Plateau to the northeast.

By the 11th century AD, a number of loosely connected rice-growing and trading states flourished in the upper Chao Phraya Valley. They broke free from domination of the Khmer Empire, but from the middle of the 14th century gradually came under the control of the Ayutthaya Kingdom at the southern extremity of the floodplain.

Successive capitals, built at various points along the river, became centers of great Thai kingdoms based on rice cultivation and foreign commerce. Unlike the neighboring Khmer and Burmese, the Thai continued to look outward across the Gulf of Thailand and the Andaman Sea toward foreign ports of trade.

When European colonisation of Southeast Asia brought a new phase in Southeast Asian commerce in the late-1800s, Thailand (known then as Siam) was able to maintain its independence as a buffer zone between British-controlled Burma to the west and French-dominated Indochina to the east, but losing over 50% of its territory in the process. Most of the areas lost contained a non-Thai population (Khmer, Lao or Shan). The Thai-speaking heartland remains intact.

Boundaries

Land boundaries
Total: 
Border countries: Myanmar , Cambodia , Laos , Malaysia

Coastline
Total:

Maritime claims
Territorial sea: 
Exclusive economic zone:  and 
Continental shelf:  depth or to the depth of exploitation

Topography and drainage

The most conspicuous features of Thailand's terrain are high mountains, a central plain, and an upland plateau. Mountains cover much of northern Thailand and extend along the Myanmar border down through the Kra Isthmus and the Malay Peninsula. The central plain is a lowland area drained by the Chao Phraya River and its tributaries, the country's principal river system, which feeds into the delta at the head of the Bay of Bangkok. The Chao Phraya system drains about one-third of the nation's territory. In the northeastern part of the country the Khorat Plateau, a region of gently rolling low hills and shallow lakes, drains into the Mekong River via the Mun River. The Mekong system empties into the South China Sea and includes a series of canals and dams.

Together, the Chao Phraya and Mekong systems sustain Thailand's agricultural economy by supporting wet-rice cultivation and providing waterways for the transport of goods and people. In contrast, the distinguishing natural features of peninsular Thailand are long coastlines, offshore islands, and mangrove swamps.

Area
Total: 
Land: 
Water: 

Extreme points

Extreme points of the mainland
Northernmost point: Myanmar border, Mae Sai District, Chiang Rai Province, at 
Southernmost point: Malaysian border, Betong District, Yala Province, at 
Easternmost point: Laos border, Khong Chiam District, Ubon Ratchathani Province, at 
Westernmost point: Myanmar border, Mae Sariang District, Mae Hong Son Province, at

Elevation extremes
Highest point: Doi Inthanon, at 
Lowest point: Gulf of Thailand, 0 metres - sea level

Regions

The National Research Council divides Thailand into six geographical regions, based on natural features including landforms and drainage, as well as human cultural patterns. They are, namely: the North Region, the Northeast Region, the Central Region, the East Region, the West Region and the South Region of Thailand. Although Bangkok geographically is part of the central plain, as the capital and largest city this metropolitan area may be considered in other respects a separate region. Each of the six geographical regions differs from the others in population, basic resources, natural features, and level of social and economic development. The diversity of the regions is in fact the most pronounced attribute of Thailand's physical setting.

Northern Thailand
Northern Thailand is a mountainous area. Parallel mountain ranges extend from the Daen Lao Range (ทิวเขาแดนลาว), in the southern region of the Shan Hills, in a north-south direction, the Dawna Range (ทิวเขาดอยมอนกุจู) forming the western border of Thailand between Mae Hong Son and the Salween River, the Thanon Thong Chai Range (เทือกเขาถนนธงชัย), the Khun Tan Range (ดอยขุนตาน), the Phi Pan Nam Range (ทิวเขาผีปันน้ำ), as well as the western part of the Luang Prabang Range (ทิวเขาหลวงพระบาง).

These high mountains are incised by steep river valleys and upland areas that border the central plain. Most rivers, including the Nan, Ping, Wang, and Yom, unite in the lowlands of the lower-north region and the upper-central region. The Ping River and the Nan River unite to form the Chao Phraya River. The northeastern part is drained by rivers flowing into the Mekong basin, like the Kok and Ing.

Traditionally, these natural features made possible several different types of agriculture, including wet-rice farming in the valleys and shifting cultivation in the uplands. The forested mountains also promoted a spirit of regional independence. Forests, including stands of teak and other economically useful hardwoods that once dominated the north and parts of the northeast, had diminished by the 1980s to 130,000 km2. In 1961 they covered 56% of the country, but by the mid-1980s forestland had been reduced to less than 30% of Thailand's total area.

Northeastern Thailand

The northeast, with its poor soils, also is not favoured agriculturally. However, sticky rice, the staple food of the region, which requires flooded, poorly drained paddy fields, thrives and where fields can be flooded from nearby streams, rivers and ponds, often two harvests are possible each year. Cash crops such as sugar cane and manioc are cultivated on a vast scale, and to a lesser extent, rubber. Silk production is an important cottage industry and contributes significantly to the economy.

The region consists mainly of the dry Khorat Plateau which in some parts is extremely flat, and a few low but rugged and rocky hills, the Phu Phan Mountains. The short monsoon season brings heavy flooding in the river valleys. Unlike the more fertile areas of Thailand, the northeast has a long dry season, and much of the land is covered by sparse grasses. Mountains ring the plateau on the west and the south, and the Mekong delineates much of the northern and eastern rim. Some varieties of traditional medicinal herbs, particularly of the Genus Curcuma, family Zingiberaceae, are indigenous to the region.

Central Thailand
The "heartland", central Thailand, is a natural self-contained basin often termed "the rice bowl of Asia". The complex irrigation system developed for wet-rice agriculture in this region provided the necessary economic support to sustain the development of the Thai state from the 13th century Sukhothai Kingdom to contemporary Bangkok. Here the rather flat unchanging landscape facilitated inland water and road transport. The fertile area was able to sustain a dense population, 422 people per square kilometre in 1987, compared with an average of 98 for the country as a whole. The terrain of the region is dominated by the Chao Phraya and its tributaries and by the cultivated paddy fields. Metropolitan Bangkok, the focal point of trade, transport, and industrial activity, is on the southern edge of the region at the head of the Gulf of Thailand and includes part of the Chao Phraya delta.

Eastern Thailand
Eastern Thailand lies between the Sankamphaeng Range, which forms the border of the northeastern plateau to the north, and the Gulf of Thailand to the south. The western end of the Cardamom Mountains, known in Thailand as Thio Khao Banthat, extends into eastern Thailand. The geography of the region is characterised by short mountain ranges alternating with small basins of short rivers which drain into the Gulf of Thailand.

Fruit is a major component of agriculture in the area, and tourism plays a strong part in the economy. The region's coastal location has helped promote the Eastern Seaboard industrial development, a major factor in the economy of the region.

Western Thailand
Thailand's long mountainous border with Myanmar continues south from the north into western Thailand with the Tenasserim Hills, known in Thailand as Thio Khao Tanaosi (เทือกเขาตะนาวศรี). The geography of the western region of Thailand, like the north, is characterised by high mountains and steep river valleys.

Western Thailand hosts much of Thailand's less-disturbed forest areas. Water and minerals are also important natural resources. The region is home to many of the country's major dams, and mining is an important industry in the area.

Southern Thailand
Southern Thailand, part of a narrow peninsula, is distinctive in climate, terrain, and resources. Its economy is based on tourism, and palm oil and rubber plantations. In Krabi Province, for example, palm plantations occupy 980,000 rai (1,568 km2), or 52% of the province's farmland. Other sources of income include coconut plantations, tin mining. Rolling and mountainous terrain and the absence of large rivers are conspicuous features of the south. North-south mountain barriers and impenetrable tropical forest caused the early isolation and separate political development of this region. International access through the Andaman Sea and the Gulf of Thailand made the south a crossroads for both Theravada Buddhism, centered at Nakhon Si Thammarat, and Islam, especially in the former Pattani Kingdom on the border with Malaysia.

Provinces

Thailand's regions are divided politically into a total of 76 provinces plus Bangkok, which is a special administrative area.

Climate

Thailand's climate is influenced by monsoon winds that have a seasonal character (the southwest and northeast monsoon). The southwest monsoon, which lasts from May until October is characterized by movement of warm, moist air from the Indian Ocean to Thailand, causing abundant rain over most of the country. The northeast monsoon, active from October till February brings cold and dry air from China over most of Thailand. In southern Thailand, the northeast monsoon brings mild weather and abundant rainfall on the eastern coast of that region. Most of Thailand has a "tropical wet and dry or savanna climate" type (Köppen's Tropical savanna climate). The majority of the south as well as the eastern tip of the east have a tropical monsoon climate. Parts of the south also have a tropical rainforest climate.

Thailand has three seasons. The first is the rainy or southwest monsoon season (mid-May to mid-October) which prevails over most of the country. This season is characterized by abundant rain with August and September being the wettest period of the year. This can occasionally lead to floods. In addition to rainfall caused by the southwest monsoon, the Intertropical Convergence Zone (ITCZ) and tropical cyclones also contribute to producing heavy rainfall during the rainy season. Nonetheless, dry spells commonly occur for one to two weeks from June to early-July. This is due to the northward movement of the ITCZ to southern China. Winter or the northeast monsoon starts from mid-October until mid-February. Most of Thailand experiences dry weather during this season with mild temperatures. An exception is the southern part of Thailand which receives abundant rainfall, particularly during October to November. Summer, or the pre–monsoon season, runs from mid-February until mid-May and is characterized by warmer weather.

Due to its inland nature and latitude, the north, northeast, central, and eastern parts of Thailand experience a long period of warm weather. In contrast, outbreaks of cold air from China can bring colder temperatures; in some cases (particularly the north and northeast) close to or below . Southern Thailand is characterized by mild weather year-round with less diurnal and seasonal variations in temperatures due to maritime influences.

Most of Thailand (north, northeast, central, and east) is characterized by dry weather during the northeast monsoon and abundant rainfall during the southwest monsoon. In the southern parts of Thailand, abundant rainfall occurs in both the northeast and southwest monsoon seasons with a peak in September for the western coast and a peak in November–January on the eastern coast.

Resources and land use

Natural resources
 Tin, rubber, natural gas, tungsten, tantalum, timber, lead, fish, gypsum, lignite, fluorite, arable land.

Land use

Arable land: 30.7%
Permanent crops: 8.8%
Other: 60.5% (2011)

Land ownership
Pattamawadee Pochanukul, a lecturer from the Faculty of Economics at Thammasat University, estimates that about 59% of all arable land in Thailand belongs to the state.  the Treasury Department owned 176,467 plots of land, consisting of about 9.9 million rai (15,769.6 km2). The Ministry of Defence owns about 2.6 million rai (4,230 km2) or about 21.2% of total public land. Information from the Office of the National Anti-Corruption Commission (NACC) shows that members of the house of representatives in 2013 owned a total of 35,786 rai of land (about 57.3 km2).

Irrigated land
Total: 64,150 km² (2007)

Total renewable water resources
Total: 438.6 km3 (2011)

Environmental concerns

 Natural hazards: Land subsidence in Bangkok, resulting from the depletion of the water table; droughts (see also 2004 Indian Ocean earthquake and 2011 Thai floods). Thailand is highly exposed to the effects of climate change such as the rising sea levels and extreme weather events.
Drought: Droughts are a persistent feature of Thailand's climate. Droughts appear to be worsening: the drought of 2020 is expected to be the worst in four decades, according to the Thai Meteorological Department. and drought hazard mapping.
Air pollution 
Water pollution from organic and factory wastes
Deforestation
Soil erosion
Wildlife populations threatened by illegal hunting

International environmental agreements
Party to: biodiversity, climate change, climate change-Kyoto Protocol, desertification, endangered species, hazardous wastes, marine life conservation, Ozone layer protection, tropical timber 83, tropical timber 94, wetlands
Signed, but not ratified: Law of the Sea

Territorial disputes

History
Thailand shares boundaries with Cambodia, Laos, Malaysia, and Myanmar. Although neither China nor Vietnam border Thailand, their territories lie within 100 km of Thai territory.

Many parts of Thailand's boundaries follow natural features, such as the Mekong. Most borders were stabilized and demarcated in the late-19th and early-20th centuries in accordance with treaties forced on Thailand and its neighbors by Britain and France. In some areas, however, exact boundaries, especially along Thailand's eastern borders with Laos and Cambodia, are still disputed.

Adding to general border tensions were the activities of communist-led insurgents, whose operations were of paramount concern to the Thai government and its security forces for several decades. The problem of communist insurgency was compounded by the activity of what the Thai government labelled "antistate elements". Often the real source of border problems was ordinary criminals or local merchants involved in illegal mining, logging, smuggling, and narcotics production and trade.

Cambodia

Cambodia's disputes with Thailand after 1951 arose in part from ill-defined boundaries and changes in France's colonial fortunes. Recently, the most notable case has been a dispute over Prasat Preah Vihear submitted to the International Court of Justice, which ruled in favor of Cambodia in 1962. During the years that the Cambodian capital, Phnom Penh, was controlled by the Khmer Rouge regime of Pol Pot (1975 to 1979), the border disputes continued.

Laos

Demarcation is complete except for certain Mekong islets. The border is marked by the Mekong: at high water during the rainy season, the centre line of the current is the border, while during low water periods, all islands, mudbanks,  sandbanks, and rocks that are revealed belong to Laos.

Malaysia

In contrast to dealings with Cambodia, which attracted international attention, boundary disputes with Malaysia are usually handled more cooperatively. Continuing mineral exploration and fishing, however, are sources of potential conflict. A one kilometre segment at the mouth of the Kolok River remained in dispute with Malaysia as of 2004.

Myanmar

Sovereignty over three Andaman Sea islands remains disputed. The standing agreement, negotiated in February 1982, left undetermined the status of Ginga Island (Ko Lam), Ko Kham, and Ko Ki Nok at the mouth of the Kraburi River (Pakchan River). Subsequent negotiations in 1985, 1989, and 1990 made no progress. The two parties have designated the islands as "no man's land". Ongoing tensions in the area resulted in minor clashes in 1998, 2003, and 2013.

See also
 Isan
 List of islands of Thailand
 List of mountains in Thailand
 Atlas of Thailand

References

External links
 Atlas of Thailand
 Thailand Weather